Henry Ashton Highet, commonly known as Harry Highet, (27 January 1892 – 2 February 1989) was a New Zealand civil engineer famous for his P-class yacht design. This class is famous for being the sailing trainer vessel for many new entrants into the sport, and virtually every famous New Zealand yachtsman, including Sir Peter Blake and Russell Coutts, learnt to sail in one.

Early life and family 
Higlet was born in Wellington in 1892, the son of Scottish immigrants Thomas Morton and Isabella Highet. He was the youngest of nine children. Harry's father was an ironmonger and later worked at the Evans Bay Patent slip, introducing Harry to shipbuilding from a young age.

Higlet's sister, Mary, married George Page, Mayor of Nelson from 1935 to 1941.

Higlet was also involved in many railway construction projects in his capacity as an engineer for the New Zealand Ministry of Works.

External links 
 Tauranga Yacht Club - P Class

References 

1892 births
1989 deaths
New Zealand public servants
New Zealand people of Scottish descent
New Zealand yacht designers
People from Wellington City
20th-century New Zealand engineers
Harry Highet